was a Japanese print publisher and the driving force behind one of the woodblock printmaking movements known as shin-hanga ("new prints").

Biography 
In 1908, Watanabe married Chiyo, a daughter of the woodblock carver Chikamatsu.

Watanabe employed highly skilled carvers and printers, and commissioned artists to design prints that combined traditional Japanese techniques with elements of contemporary Western painting, such as perspective and shadows. Watanabe coined the term shin-hanga in 1915 to describe such prints. Charles W. Bartlett, Hashiguchi Goyō, Kawase Hasui, Yoshida Hiroshi, Kasamatsu Shirō, Torii Kotondo, Ohara Koson, Itō Shinsui, Takahashi Shōtei, Tsuchiya Koitsu and Yamakawa Shūhō are among the artists whose works he published.

Much of his company's stockpile of both prints and their original printing-blocks was destroyed in the Great Kantō earthquake of 1923. In the following years, new versions of many of these prints were created, using re-carved blocks; typically, the re-issued "post-quake" prints included changes and revisions in the designs.

Watanabe exported most of his shin-hanga prints to the United States and Europe due to a lack of Japanese interest. After the close of World War II, his heirs continued the business, which still operates.

Watanabe designed two prints himself under the name "Kako": Sunset Glow at West Park in Fukuoka and Lake Kawaguchi.

References
 Machida Shiritsu Kokusai Hanga Bijutsukan, Taishō jojō shinhanga no bi ten, Watanabe Shōzaburō to shinhanga undō, Tokyo, Machida-shi, Machida Shiritsu, Kokusai Hanga Bijutsukan, 1989.
 Miles, Richard and Jennifer Saville, A Printmaker in Paradise, The Art and Life of Charles W. Bartlett, with a catalogue raisonné of etchings and color woodblock prints, Honolulu, Hawaii, Honolulu Academy of Arts, 2001

Footnotes

External links
 Biography and further information The Lavenberg Collection of Japanese Prints
 S. Watanabe Color Print Co. Online Shop (Japanese)
 Catalogue of Wood-Cut Colour Prints of S. Watanabe, 1936

1885 births
1962 deaths
Japanese editors
Japanese publishers (people)
Japanese art
Japanese printmakers